Robert Leonhardt (December 27, 1872 – February 2, 1923) was an Austrian operatic baritone who sang several notable roles with the New York Metropolitan Opera between 1913 and 1922. He made numerous recordings for major record labels, both in Europe and in the United States.

Biography
Leonhardt was born in 1872 in Linz. His operatic debut was in 1898, in Linz. For four years he found permanent employment at the German Theatre in Prague starting in 1905. Specializing in Wagnerian roles, he sang in Brno from 1909 to 1911, and from 1911 until 1913 with the Vienna Volksoper while also guesting with the Vienna Imperial Opera in 1909 and the Berlin Gura Summer Opera in 1910. In October 1913 it was announced that Leonhardt had joined the New York Metropolitan opera. Sailing from Bremen, he endured a difficult voyage before arriving in the U.S. on November 6. He first appeared on stage for his new employer in December in the role of Peter in Engelbert Humperdinck's opera Hänsel und Gretel. Receiving critical acclaim for his work in this role, he would appear in Met productions over the course of the next nine years. He was expected to appear in an expanded role at the met, but world circumstances would prevent this. Beginning in December 1917 he billed himself as "Robert Leonard" to distance himself from his Germanic heritage. Nevertheless, Leonhardt, a citizen of Austria, was dropped by the New York Met in April 1918 because of his status as an enemy alien despite continued critical praise. The opera's manager, Mr. Gatti, expressed his regret at having to make such a move. Leonhardt's wife and children resided in Vienna for the duration of the war. After the war his employment recommenced with the Met and he was performing on stage again as of November 1920. Here he continued to perform until shortly before his death. He developed an illness that lasted for some time, and never recovered. Robert Leonhardt died at St. Mark's Hospital in New York City on February 2, 1923.

Performance style
Reviews of Leonhardt's performances are wide-ranging. He has been noted for a "dark, steely, throaty bass" with mundane performance, although this is perhaps due to Leonhardt being out of his voice's comfort zone regarding range. Conversely, he was noted for having a "luscious and lovely Italian voice" with a splendid, spontaneous sense of humor.

Operatic roles

United States

Recordings
Leonhardt's career are a recording artist may be more important than his performing career. He recorded many popular songs, as well as operatic arias. His recording career began in 1900 for the Gramophone Company, recording prolifically for them through 1905. Many of these recordings were issued in the Standard German Catalogue. Several European recordings also appeared on the International Zonophone and Homokord labels. From 1903 to 1905 he also made records for the European Columbia branch. He recorded cylinders for the Edison company before coming to the United States, and these were marketed in the U.S. to the German-speaking population. After changing his residency to the United States, he continued his recording career with Columbia Records from 1915 through 1920. Although promoted as from the "Metropolitan Opeara Co.", not all of his recordings were operatic and like the Edison cylinders, his records were marketed to German-speaking Americans, in their E-prefix ethnic catalog, and not to the general public. An exception is Record #A2053, to which the prestigious tri-color banner label was applied. This record was released in 1916, and an announcement was made in the English-speaking trade press, but no other records by Leonhardt appeared in this series. His final recordings were made for Victor in 1921 and 1922, also released in their ethnic series. Collectors of operatic recordings were instructed to seek out these ethnic selections of Leonhardt's.

Discography
(incomplete)

Note: All Columbia listings are U.S. releases.

References

1877 births
1923 deaths
Columbia Records artists
Edison Records artists
Victor Records artists
Musicians from Linz
Austrian operatic baritones
19th-century Austrian male opera singers
20th-century Austrian male opera singers
Austro-Hungarian emigrants to the United States